Neustadt in Sachsen is a town in the Sächsische Schweiz-Osterzgebirge district, in Saxony, Germany. It is situated near the border with the Czech Republic, 35 km east of Dresden (centre), and 23 km southwest of Bautzen. At Neustadt, there is an Observation Tower at Goetzinger's Height, one of the oldest lattice towers in the world.

On August 1, 2007 the villages Berthelsdorf, Langburkersdorf, Niederottendorf, Oberottendorf, Rückersdorf and Rugiswalde of the former municipality Hohwald were integrated into the town.

Buildings of Interest

Town hall (c.1700)
Vicarage (1616)
St Jacob's Church (rebuilt 1884)

References

External links